Berseba is a constituency in the ǁKaras Region of Namibia. The main settlement is Berseba.  the constituency had 6,659 registered voters.

Berseba constituency contains the Brukkaros crater and the settlements of Snyfontein, Helmeringhausen, Tses, Bethanie, and Goageb. It had a population of 10,589 in 2011, up from 9,064 in 2001. The first diamonds in Namibia were found in this area in 1898, while oil was found in 1929.

Politics
In the 2010 regional elections, SWAPO's Dawid Boois won the constituency with 1,225 votes. He defeated challengers Aron Lucas Stephanus of RDP (558 votes), Regina Kuhlman of DTA (397 votes), Hendrik Christiaan Humphries of the DP (296 votes) and Bernardt Barry Stephanus of COD (126 votes). Boois remains councillor of this constituency after he won again the 2015 regional elections with 1,774 votes. Diederik Isaak Vries of the DTA obtained 901 votes, and Trougot Metusalag Kaffer of the RDP obtained 148 votes.

The 2020 regional election was won by Jeremias Gooieman of the Landless People's Movement (LPM, a new party registered in 2018). He obtained 1,822 votes. The SWAPO candidate, Steve Sensus Ovambo, came second with 1,127 votes.

References

Constituencies of ǁKaras Region
States and territories established in 1992
1992 establishments in Namibia